is a free zoo opened in April 1951 and located in Nogeyama Park, in Nishi-ku, Yokohama, Japan. It is open from 9:30 am to 4:00 pm and is closed on Mondays.

The zoo is operated by the Yokohama Zoological Garden, and is a member of the Japanese Association of Zoos and Aquariums (JAZA).

Animals

Animals at the zoo include Mandarin ducks, cranes, red pandas, chimpanzees, hamadryas baboons, reptiles, lion, tigers, tanuki (raccoon dogs), badgers, pheasants, love birds, zebras, giraffes, flamingos, camels, ruffed lemurs, white-mantled black colobus, black-capped capuchins, swans, ducks, kagus, penguins, wallaby, deer, eagles, owls, condors, bears, and Tokyo bitterlings.

The red panda is one of the first animals visitors see upon entering the zoo, and also one of the most popular.

Makigahara Children's Zoo

The Makigahara Children's Zoo was opened in 1979 as part of the Nogeyama Zoo. It is primarily home to small animals such as mice, guinea pigs, chickens, and fantail pigeons, and snakes.

Conservation

The Nogeyama Zoo was the first zoo in Japan to successfully house leopards (1952), blackbuck (1953), dromedary (1954), sloth bear (1965), ring-tailed lemur (1969), pileated gibbon and caracal (1974), clouded leopard (1983), giant anteater (1985), Kleinmann's tortoise (1992), Asian forest tortoise (1997), and radiated tortoise (2009). It was also the second zoo in the world to successful breed Andean condors in captivity in 1972.
In 2016 the highly endangered Ploughshare tortoise from Madagascar was bred.

Notes

External links

 (Japanese)
Nogeyama Zoological Gardens Remembrance and Records (in Japanese)
Oideyo! Nogeyama Zoo (in Japanese)

1951 establishments in Japan
Zoos in Japan
Buildings and structures in Yokohama
Tourist attractions in Yokohama
Parks and gardens in Kanagawa Prefecture
Zoos established in 1951